Hoplisoides hamatus is a species of sand wasp in the family Crabronidae.  It is found in North America.

References

Further reading

 
 
 

Crabronidae
Insects described in 1888